Saber Hraiech (born 30 July 1995) is an Italian football player of Tunisian descent. He plays as a midfielder for  club Cesena.

Club career
Born in Mazara del Vallo, Sicily to parents of Tunisian origin, he made his footballing debut with his hometown team at the age of 15 in the Serie D league, and successively as a first team regular in the club's following Eccellenza Sicily's campaign at the age of 16.

He made his Serie C debut for Virtus Entella on 6 January 2013 in a game against Tritium.

After three years at Serie D and Serie C level for Piacenza, he joined Serie B club Carpi for the 2017–18 season. He was loaned out to newly promoted Serie C club Imolese in August 2018. On 24 September 2020, he was loaned to Serie C club Padova, with an obligation to buy.

On 23 July 2022, he left Padova for Serie C club Cesena.

References

External links
 

1995 births
Living people
People from Mazara del Vallo
Footballers from Sicily
Italian people of Tunisian descent
Italian sportspeople of African descent
Italian footballers
Association football midfielders
Serie B players
Serie C players
Serie D players
Virtus Entella players
Piacenza Calcio 1919 players
A.C. Carpi players
Imolese Calcio 1919 players
Calcio Padova players
Cesena F.C. players
Sportspeople from the Province of Trapani